Danbury High School may refer to:

Danbury High School, Danbury, Connecticut
Danbury High School (Lakeside, Ohio), Lakeside Marblehead, Ohio
Danbury High School (Texas), Danbury, Texas